The Violin Sonata No. 9, Op. 47 in A major, by Ludwig van Beethoven, is an 1803 sonata for piano and violin notable for its technical difficulty, unusual length (around 40 minutes), and emotional scope. It is commonly known as the Kreutzer Sonata after the violinist Rodolphe Kreutzer, to whom it was ultimately dedicated, but who thoroughly disliked the piece and refused to play it.

Composition
In the composer's 1803 sketchbook, the work was titled "Sonata per il Pianoforte ed uno violino obligato in uno stile molto concertante come d’un concerto" ("Sonata for the piano and one obligatory violin in a highly concertante style like a concerto"). The final movement of the work was originally written for another, earlier, sonata for violin and piano by Beethoven, the Sonata No. 6, Op. 30, No. 1, in A major.

Beethoven gave no key designation to the work. Although the work is usually titled as being in A major, the Austrian composer and music theoretician Gerhard Präsent has published articles indicating that the main key is in fact A minor.

Premiere and dedication
The sonata was originally dedicated to the violinist George Bridgetower (1778–1860) as "Sonata mulattica composta per il mulatto Brischdauer [Bridgetower], gran pazzo e compositore mulattico" (Mulatto Sonata composed for the mulatto Brischdauer, great madman mulatto composer). Shortly after completion the work was premiered by Bridgetower and Beethoven on 24 May 1803 at the Augarten Theatre at a concert that started at the unusually early hour of 8:00 am. Bridgetower sight-read the sonata; he had never seen the work before, and there had been no time for any rehearsal.

After the premiere performance, Beethoven and Bridgetower fell out: while the two were drinking, Bridgetower apparently insulted the morals of a woman whom Beethoven cherished. Enraged, Beethoven removed the dedication of the piece, dedicating it instead to Rodolphe Kreutzer, who was considered the finest violinist of the day.

Structure

The piece is in three movements, and takes approximately 43 minutes to perform:

Reception

After its successful premiere in 1803, the work was published in 1805 as Beethoven's Op. 47, with its re-dedication to Rudolphe Kreutzer, which gave the composition its nickname. Kreutzer never performed the work, considering it "outrageously unintelligible". He did not particularly care for any of Beethoven's music, and they only ever met once, briefly.

Referring to Beethoven's composition, Leo Tolstoy's novella The Kreutzer Sonata was first published in 1889. That novella was adapted in various stage and film productions, contributing to Beethoven's composition becoming known to the general public.

Rita Dove's 2009 Sonata Mulattica reimagined the life of Bridgetower, the sonata's original dedicatee, in poetry, thus writing about the sonata that connected the composer and the violinist who first performed it.

Reference in Film

Within Bernard Rose's autobiographical film of Beethoven's life, Immortal Beloved, Beethoven (as played by Gary Oldman) relates to Anton Schindler (Jeroen Krabbe) the inspiration for the first movement Adagio-Presto, where Schindler is listening to the rehearsal prior to the premier performance by George Bridgetower and Ignaz Schuppanzigh. As recorded by Schindler in his biography of the composer, Beethoven then gave an explanation of what the music represented to him - and this then had bearing on the identity of the immortal beloved in turn.

"...What was in my mind when I wrote this ? ... A man is travelling to meet his lover by coach, during a storm. The coach wheel is broken, unable to move, by the side of the road. She will only wait so long.  This - is the sound of his agitation."

References

Further reading
ESTA-Nachrichten (European String Teachers Association) No. 51, March 2004, p. 13ff, Stuttgart.
"Mitteilungen des Steirischen Tonkünstlerbundes" No. 1/2, June 2003, Graz.

External links
 
 
 
 Story about the Dedication of Kreutzer Sonata
 European Archive Copyright free LP recording of the Kreutzer sonata Max Rostal (violin) and Franz Osborn (piano) at the European Archive (for non-American viewers only).
 Performance of Violin Sonata No. 9 by Corey Cerovsek (violin) and Paavali Jumppanen (piano) from the Isabella Stewart Gardner Museum

Violin Sonata 09
1803 compositions
Music dedicated to ensembles or performers